Stefan Thynell (born 10 September 1954) is a Swedish engineer and former sports shooter. He competed at the 1976 Summer Olympics and the 1980 Summer Olympics. Thynell joined the Mechanical Engineering Department at Pennsylvania State University in 1986 and was promoted to full professor in 1997.

References

External links
 

1954 births
Living people
Swedish male sport shooters
Olympic shooters of Sweden
Shooters at the 1976 Summer Olympics
Shooters at the 1980 Summer Olympics
People from Hässleholm Municipality
Pennsylvania State University faculty
Swedish engineers
Sportspeople from Skåne County
20th-century Swedish people
21st-century Swedish people